"What Kind of Love" is a song co-written and recorded by American country music artist Rodney Crowell. It was released in June 1992 as the second single from the album Life Is Messy. The song reached number 11 on the U.S. Billboard Hot Country Singles & Tracks chart and peaked at number 2 on the RPM Country Tracks in Canada.

History
Crowell and co-writer Will Jennings wrote the lyrics to a recording of a melody that Roy Orbison had made before his death. The song features backing vocals from Don Henley and Linda Ronstadt.

Critical reception
Deborah Evans Price, of Billboard magazine reviewed the song favorably, calling it the "first step in a major effort to immerse this rock-influenced country star into the pop and AC realm. She goes on to say that "twangy instrumentation a la Tom Petty and the late Roy Orbison (with whom this song was penned), combined with an appealing vocal, makes a strong argument for play at these and album rock formats."

Personnel
From Life Is Messy liner notes.
Musicians
Mickey Curry - drums
Don Henley - background vocals
Booker T. Jones - Hammond organ
Larry Klein - bass guitar, keyboards
Linda Ronstadt - background vocals
Steuart Smith - guitars

Technical
Larry Klein - producer
Dan Marnien - engineering, mixing

Chart performance
"What Kind of Love" debuted at number 75 on the U.S. Billboard Hot Country Singles & Tracks for the week of June 27, 1992.

Year-end charts

Other versions
Mike Walker covered the song on his 2002 album for DreamWorks Records. It was the B-side to the album's first single, "Honey Do".

References

1992 singles
Rodney Crowell songs
Songs written by Rodney Crowell
Songs written by Roy Orbison
Songs with lyrics by Will Jennings
Columbia Records singles
1992 songs